Friday's Child is the second studio album by English singer Will Young. It was released on 1 December 2003 and reached number one on the UK Albums Chart. The album has gone 5× Platinum in the UK, with worldwide sales of over 1.8 million. The second single taken from the album, "Your Game", won Best British Single at the 2005 Brit Awards.

Critical reception

Allmusic editor Jon O'Brien found that "Young has made the brave decision to move away from pop's most influential man Simon Cowell for follow-up Friday's Child [...] It's a much more personal affair that showcases both his songwriting talent and his undoubtedly unique soulful tones [...] While certainly far more adventurous than his debut, it still sometimes lapses into MOR territory, particularly on the Simply Red-esque "Free" and the rather aimless and ultimately quite drab acoustic ballad "Very Kind." But overall, Friday's Child will undoubtedly bury the reality pop tag once and for all. Britain's first Pop Idol has become an artist in his own right and the fact he's done it without the Cowell juggernaut behind him should make its success even sweeter."

Track listing

Notes
 signifies an additional producer
 signifies an original producer

Personnel
Performers and musicians

Will Young – vocals
Toby Baker – keyboards
Anne Dudley – keyboards
Greg Wells – keyboards
Rick Willson – guitar
Stephen Lipson – guitar
John Themis – guitar
David Rainger – guitar
Tim Cansfield – guitar
Eg White – guitar, instruments on "Going My Way" and "Out of My Mind"
Blair MacKichan – guitar, backing vocals
Neil Conti – drums
Steve Barney – drums
Guy Barker – trumpet
Neil Yates – brass arrangements
Phil Todd – flute
Mark Feltham – harmonica
Steve Lee – harmonica
Tracy Ackerman – backing vocals
Lynne Marie – backing vocals
Karen Poole – backing vocals
Metro Voices – gospel choir
Toby Smith – instruments on "Dance the Night Away"
Chris Dodd – instruments on "Dance the Night Away"

Technical

Stephen Lipson – producer, programmer
Blair MacKichan – producer, programmer
Toby Smith – producer, mixer, brass arrangement
Chris Dodd – producer
Robin Thicke – producer
Pro-Jay – producer, engineer
Eg White – producer, mixer
Dave Naughton – ProTools
Heff Moraes – engineer, mixer
Andy Saunders – mix engineer
Sam Miller – additional engineering
Steve Lee – programming
Jenny O'Grady – choir master
Nick Ingman – orchestral arrangement
Anne Dudley – orchestral arrangement

Charts

Weekly charts

Year-end charts

Certifications

References

2003 albums
Will Young albums
Albums produced by Robin Thicke
Albums produced by Stephen Lipson
19 Recordings albums